This list features the production discography of Natalia Germanou.  She wrote the lyrics for the following songs.

Production Discography

1990

Mando - Ptisi Gia Dio
Pos

1991

Kostas Charitodiplomenos - Kaigomai
Fyge
Moro Mou
Kane Paihnidi

Thanos Kalliris - Se Katadikazo
Fevgo
Se Katadikazo
Oi Adres Protimoun Tis Ksanthies
Kalinihta

1992

Mando - Esthisis
Mesanihta

Sakis Rouvas - Min Adistekese
Dose Mou Mia Nihta
Min Adistekese

Katy Garbi - Tou Feggariou Anapnoes
Pes To M’ Ena Fili

Sabrina - Stin Agkalia Mou Ela
Pagida

Yiannis Koutras - Ksafnika
Ki Arhizis To Kryfto

Vaggelis Spanakakis - Akrivos
Ase Me Emena
Andriki Kolonia

1993

Sabrina - Eleftheri
Ftais
Glikia
Ase Me
Gia Sou
Efialtis

Labis Livieratos - As Ixa Ti Dinami
Kleftra

Thanos Kalliris - Ena Psema Gia To Telos
Krata Ena Psema Gia To Telos
Apomakrinese
O Palios Ine Allios
Se Miso
Min Tolmisis

Sakis Rouvas - Gia Sena
Tha S’ Ekdikitho

Valeria Christodoulidou - Valeria
I Douli Tou Christou

1994

Doukissa - O Erotas Einai Ellinas
Kalo Alla Ligo
Fovamai
Amartoli Mou Paraskevi

Victoria Halkiti - Erotas Einai 
Erotas Einai
Aspro Kai Mavro
Elefteri
Pirkagia
Ohi, Ohi, Ohi
Apo To Radiofono
De S’ Agapisa Pote
Ela (Pale movie)
Happy Birthday

Thanos Kalliris - Kapoio Kalokeri
Kapoio Kalokeri
Alimono
Ela Fegari Mou
Kerdisame

Giorgos Mazonakis – Me Ta Matia Na To Les
Tipota
Teleftea Fora

Polina– Kenourgios Erotas
 Gia Mena Ego
 Kenourgios Erotas

Efi Sarri - Petao
Petao
Apotoma

Lefteris Pantazis - O Paihtis
Pes Pos M' Agapas

Stathis Aggelopoulos - Kripse Me Stin Agkalia Sou
Kripse Me

Petros Kolettis - Tora Einai I Seira Mou
Tora Einai I Seira Mou
Akoma Ponao
Ase Me Isiho
Ola Afta Einai I Zoi
Kamia Fora

1995

Sofia Arvaniti - I Agapi Ta Panta Nikai
Esto Mia Nihta

Spiros Spirakos - Kai Na’ Kseres
Ah Kai Na’ Kseres
Afta Pou Ikseres Na Ta Ksehaseis

Nikos Karvelas - 25 Ores
Ragise O Kathreftis

Polina - "Deka Hronia Meta"

1996

Labis Livieratos - Bam Kai Kato
Bam Kai Kato
Psemata
Na Tou Pis
Koita Na Apofasisis
Ola Edo Plironode
Osa Xiliometra

Thanos Kalliris - Monaxa Tin Psixi Sou
Ksilina Spathia
Fovame Tis Defteres
Monaxa Tin Psihi Sou
I Aniksi De Meni Pia Edo

Despina Vandi - Esena Perimeno
Esena Perimeno
Oi Adres Theloun Pedema

Sakis Rouvas - Tora Arhizoun Ta Diskola
Tora Arhizoun Ta Diskola
Mi M’ Agapisis
Pos Ta Kataferes
Kapote Tha’ Maste Mazi
Diaforetikos
Eimai Hamenos
Dos Mou

Anna Vissi - Klima Tropiko
Sentonia
Dixasmeno Kormi

1997

Giorgos Alkaios - En Psixro
Ta Dika Mou Tragoudia
Perasmena Nai, Ksexasmena Oxi 
Kalitera Monos Mou

Sabrina - Epikindino Pehnidi
Ena Ena
Epikindino Pehnidi
Tora Einai Arga
Den Exoume Tipota
Alli Mia Porta Ekleise

Thanos Kalliris - Fonakse Me
Adexo
Fonakse Me An Me Hriastis
Ponao
Na Mino I Na Figo
Eftixos
Filos + Erastis

Despina Vandi - Deka Entoles
Metaniono

Lefteris Pantazis - Erhete
Anesthitiko

Antypas - Kategida
Orkizomai

Katerina Stanisi - Imoun, Eimai Kai Tha Eimai 
Apo Pou Ki Os Pou

Anna Vissi - Travma
Siga!
Na’ Sai Kala
Apolito Keno

Nikos Karvelas - O Pio Eftihismenos Anthropos Pano Sti Gi
Magkia Sou

1998

Dimitris Kokotas - Gia Mena
Apogoiteftika

Triantafillos – Grammata Kai Afierosis
Ponese Me

Valantis - Sto Ansaser
Den To Pistevo
Pou Pas;
Ti Allo Thes?

Angie Samiou - Apousies
Mia Sou Kai Mia Mou
Ki Ego Edo

Petros Imvrios - Allimono
Den Th’ Allaksis
Allimono Se Mena
Prosexe
Tha To Metaniosis
Sigxorese Me
Thessaloniki
Efxaristos
Tremo Stin Idea
Mi Me Lipase

Katerina Topazi - Maheria
Ena Lepto
Dexome
Xilies Fores
Paradinome

Anna Meliti - Anna Meliti
Nai
Fyge
Lathos
Ilie Mou

Labis Livieratos - Roda Einai
Ipotithetai

Labis Livieratos - Poios Einai Autos
An Den Se Do

Victoria Halkiti - Einai Fores 
Tha Sou Figo
Pada
To Kalokairi Mou
Afou De M’ Agapas

Thanos Kalliris - Ena Xamogelo Gia Ton Adrea
Ena Xamogelo Gia Ton Adrea

Thanos Kalliris - Agapi Ora Miden
Mia Signomi
Agapi Ora Miden
Monaksia Mou
Gia Sou Kai Na M’ Agapas
Ena Xamogelo Gia Ton Adrea

Natasa Theodoridou - Defteri Agapi
Peripou
Nixta Se Gnorisa
Kane Kati

Antonis Remos - Keros Na Pame Parakato
Pame Parakato
Dropi Sou
Aftos
Ma De Mporeis

Sakis Rouvas - Kati Apo Mena
Ta Aspra Triadafilla
Arketa

Anna Vissi - Antidoto
Na Ton Agapas

Nikos Karvelas – Ena Hrono To Perissotero
Monachoulis

1999

Evridiki - To Koumpi
Erotevmenoi Echthroi

Labis Livieratos - To Kalitero Paidi
Oute Kalimera
Horizo
Ipotithete

Elli Kokkinou - Epikindina Pehnidia
Anagazomai

Antonis Remos – Pali Apo Tin Arxi
Mi Zitas Signomi (Taj mahal)
Mono Mi Mou Pis Pos M’ Agapas

2000

Mando - Se Alli Diastasi
Pio Poli
Fovame

Giorgos Alkaios - Pro Ton Pilon
To Tilefono Mou
Mi
La Bamba

Ekeinos Kai Ekeinos - Ena Rodo Kai Ena Agathi
San To Teleutaio Tsigaro

Harry Varthakouris - Adespotes Oi Nixtes
To Tragoudi Tou Xari III (Tipota)

Labis Livieratos - Labis Moro Mou
Opou Ki An Pas
Alitissa Vroxi

Thanos Kalliris - Eimai Kala
Egoismos

Elli Kokkinou - Andriki Kolonia
Andriki Kolonia
Ki Oso Gia Mena
De Tha Xaseis
Gia Mia Fora

Litsa Giagousi - Kai Sto Eksis
Vrexi
Asto, Min Orkizese
Ase Me
Eimai Edo

Natasa Theodoridou - Tha Miliso Me T'Asteria
An Iparxi Paradeisos
Ego Na Ipoxoro

Anna Vissi - Kravgi
Kalitera I Dio Mas
Kopike I Grammi

Anna Vissi - Everything I Am
Moro Mou (No Tomorrow) (vocals by Natalia)

2001

Triantafillos - Afiste Minima
Enas Katharos Egoismos

Katy Garbi - Apla Ta Pragmata
Esi Tha Hasis
Pes To (Ksana) Me Ena Fili
Auto Pou Zisame

IRO - Apogiosi
Kamia Fora

Antique - Me Logia Ellinika
Kainouria Agapi

Labis Livieratos - Ela
Ego Ki Ego
Opou Ki An Pas
Pirasmos (nessuno mi puo' giudicare)
Alitissa Vroxi

Thanos Kalliris - Eonia
Aftos O Himonas

Despina Vandi - Gia
Thelo Na Se Do
Ela
Eime Ego

Natasa Theodoridou - Ip'Efthini Mou
Tora To Thimithikes

Christina Anagnostopoulou - Ke Hamogelao
Ke Hamogelao
Enohes
Proto Fili
Tilefonima

2002

Dimitris Raptis - To Fili Tis Zois
To Fili Tis Zois

Giannis Vardis - Pes Mou Ti Niotheis
Fteo

Petros Imvrios - Petros Imvrios
To Paradehomai
Ena Oneiro Telioni
Poio Fegari 
Akoma Kai Esi
Alli Mia Nixta
Ki Etsi Opos Feugis
Agapao Kai Ponao

Antique - Alli Mia Fora
De M’ Agapas

Marianta Pieridi - I Gineka Tis Zois Sou
S’ Agapo
Anapodo Fegari
I Gineka Tis Zois Sou
Giro Mou...
Blue Jean

Peggy Zina - Vres Enan Tropo
Tolmas Kai Eheis Parapono, Esi?

Sakis Rouvas - Ola Kala
Pou Tha Pas
Tha Erthi I Stigmi

Notis Sfakianakis - As Milisoun Ta Tragoudia
Gia Sena Fovame

Anna Vissi - X
Martirio

2003

2 Lips - 2
Min Antistekese

Grigoris Petrakos - Ola Arxizoun
Fotografies

Filoi Gia Pada - Tainia Fadasias
Eksi Feggaria
Tha To Dis

Nino - Nino
Horis Na Se Ksero

Petros Imvrios - Mou Leipeis Toso
De Sou Aksize Agapi
Ksena Heria

Marianta Pieridi - Oute Ki Esi
Oute Ki Esi

Marianta Pieridi - Vale Fantasia 
Oute Ki Esi
Katallili Stigmi

Elli Kokkinou - Sto Kokkino
Eimai Kala
Thelo Tosa Na Sou Po

Giorgos Tsalikis - Ekana Ti Nixta Mera
Kapos Etsi

Litsa Giagousi - Akou
Ase Me Isixi
Apothimeno
Pes Mou
Teliomeni Mou Agapi

Katy Garbi - Emmones Idees
 Antres

Dimitris Raptis - To Fili Tis Zois
To Fili Tis Zois
Agapi Mou
Ti Amo

Peggy Zina - Mazi Sou
Den Aksizis

Anna Vissi - Paraksenes Ikones
Ego Moro Mou
Ksafnika

2004

Aspa Tsina - Gialina Oneira
Ego Agapi Mou
Agapi Enoxi
Ola Gia Xari Sou

Marina Solonos - Marina Solonos
S'Agapo-Se Miso
Alli Mia Eukairia

Aggeliki Iliadi - Ena Xrono Mazi
Ena Hrono Mazi

Giorgos Aksas - Methismenes Thalasses
Apolito Keno

Christos Kostaras- Christos Kostaras
Ginaika Esi Tis Zois Mou

Eleana Papaioannou- Koitakse Me
Kalinixta

Nino - Ilikrinis
Gia Mena Tha Ziso

Petros Imvrios - Kathe Avrio
Tha Se Thimame
Kathe Avrio Pou Pernai
Ise Kalokairi

Giorgos Giannias - 5 Lepta
Agapise Me

Chrispa- Hryspa
Afou De M’ Agapas

Chostadinos Christoforou- Idiotiki Parastasi
Den Prepi Na Se Do
Prepi Na Se Do

Giorgos Tsalikis - O Telios Adras
O Telios Adras
O Prigipas
Dinamitis
Sto Palio Amartima
Ipokatastato
Poios Ine Autos?
Sou Xrostao Polla
Fili Klemmeno

Despina Vandi - Stin Avli Tou Paradisou
To Proto Mas Fili
Kantoo An M’ Agapas

Christos Dantis - Maya Maya
Amore
Monos De Thelo

2005

Periklis - Periplaniseis
Apolito Keno

Aggeliki Iliadi - Tora Ti Thes?
Nai S'Agapo

Valantis - Krata Me
Aggele Mou Kai Aliti

Maro Lytra - Mikres Amarties
Ma Den Mporo Na Se Ksexaso (Dakhilak Oud)
Mi Me Koitas (Give me a sign)

Andreas Stamos - Nixtes Paraksenes...
Enas Kainourgios Erotas
Ola Kapote Telionoun

Christos Kostaras- Logo Timis
Ginaika Esi Tis Zois Mou (Plus II Mix)

Kelly Kelekidou- Kelly Kelekidou
Lathos Antras

Chrispa- Hryspa 100%
Afou De M’ Agapas

Chostadinos Christoforou- O Giros Tou Kosmou
Otan Den Iparxi Agapi

Elli Kokkinou - SEX
Gia Sou
Erotevmeni Poli

Elena Paparizou - Protereotita: Euro Edition
My Number One (winner song of the Eurovision Song Contest 2005)

Giorgos Tsalikis - Pyretos
Alisida
Edo Tha Mino
Lipis

Christos Dantis - Kata Vathos
Prodosia
Eklipsi Selinis
Agapise Me
Thelo Na Se Vlepo

2006

Sarbel - Sahara
San Kai Mena...Pouthena (Like Me...Nowhere)

Christos Kostaras- Kammeno Arnitiko
Kapoios Allos
Otan O Adras De Mila
Dikopo Maxairi
Mi Me Lipithis
 Ginaika Esi Tis Zois Mou (Plus II Mix)

Petros Imvrios - S’Efxaristo
Tora Tha Kles
Horis Esena

Giorgos Christou - Gia Na Doume
Kai Se Fadazome
Kollisa
Mou’ Xeis Teleiosi
Gia Na Doume
Apo Sena Eksartate
Mia Signomi
Sigxaritiria
Min Kles Moro Mou

Elena Paparizou - Iparhi Logos
Panta Se Perimena (Idaniko Fili)

Giorgos Tsalikis - Agapi Axaristi
Agapi Axaristi

Mihalis Hatzigiannis - Filoi Ki Ehthri
Esi

2007

Gogo Mastrokosta - Amartia
Pos Tha Mporeso

Nadia Mitroudi - Afisa Stin Porta Ta Kleidia
Oxi Esi, Ego

Giorgos Lianos - Sti Mesi
O,ti Kai An Isoun

Thanos Tzanis - Einai Agapi
Einai Agapi
Tha Metaniosis
H Ginaika Tis Zois Sou
Se Paradexome
Paradinome
Kanenas Adras
Monaxa Mia Agapi
Ftanei Na M'Agapas
Mi Me Lipase
Asto
Tha Figo
Tis Monaksias To Vlemma

Thanos Petrelis - Eimai Akomi Eleftheros
Etsi Ime

Kostadinos Gavelas - Mia Fora
Mia Fora
Palionoume

Giorgos Tsalikis - Enoxa Vradia
An M’ Agapas

Christos Dantis - No Madonna - Bleeding
No Madonna

2010

Sakis Rouvas - Parafora
"Proti Nihta"

Harry Varthakouris - Arhodas you Kosmou
"Esto (To tragoudi tou Harry no5)"

2013

Konstantinos Argyros - Paidi Gennaio
"Pote Ksana"

2014

Konstantinos Argyros - Defteri Fora
"Emeis De Tha Horisoume Pote"

References

Production discographies
Discographies of Greek artists
Pop music discographies